"Sittin' on Chrome" is a song from hip hop crew Masta Ace Incorporated and the title track from their 1995 album Sittin' on Chrome. A maxi-single features two alternate mixes, the "Pitkin Ave Mix" and the "Rockaway Ave Mix", as well as two previously unreleased tracks, which were later featured on Ace's Hits U Missed compilation in 2004.

Track listing

Charts

References

1995 singles